A list of films produced in South Korea in 1983:

References

External links
1983 in South Korea

 1980-1989 at www.koreanfilm.org

1983
South Korean
1983 in South Korea